Crataegus lepida is the smallest of the hawthorn species in series Lacrimatae, the "weeping hawthorns", of the southeastern U.S. It blooms when less than 1 m tall and has great potential as a garden plant.

References

lepida
Flora of North America